Dustin Penner (born September 28, 1982) is a Canadian former  professional ice hockey forward who played in the National Hockey League (NHL) for the Anaheim Ducks, Edmonton Oilers, Los Angeles Kings and Washington Capitals. Undrafted by any NHL team, in 2004, Penner signed with Anaheim after playing college hockey at the University of Maine in the National Collegiate Athletics Association (NCAA). Penner won the Stanley Cup in his first full season with the Anaheim Ducks in 2007, before adding a second Stanley Cup in his first full season with Los Angeles in 2012.

Playing career

Minors and collegiate
Growing up in Winkler, Manitoba, Penner played for his high school hockey team, the Garden Valley Collegiate Zodiacs, alongside future Washington Capitals teammate Eric Fehr. After high school, he was cut by many minor hockey teams, including his local junior club three times.

With little hope of ever playing hockey professionally, Penner agreed to play with Minot State University-Bottineau, now known as Dakota College at Bottineau, but immediately broke his femur, ending his first year with the club. The next year, in the 2001–02 season, he became a very important player for Bottineau, scoring 20 goals with 13 assists in 23 games, also earning the Most Determined Player Award for his improvement and stellar play after recovering from his injury.

Penner then went to an evaluation camp at Saskatoon. He played well there, scoring an average of three points per game. He was scouted by Grant Standbrook, the assistant coach for the University of Maine's Black Bears ice hockey team, and was offered a scholarship, which he accepted. Although he did not initially join the team, in the 2003–04 season, he helped lead the Black Bears and to the NCAA Championship game, scoring the game-winning goal in the semi-finals against Boston College. Maine then lost the championship title game to the University of Denver 1–0.

Anaheim Ducks
Having been undrafted by any NHL team, on May 12, 2004, Penner signed a three-year, entry-level contract with the Mighty Ducks of Anaheim. He was assigned to the Cincinnati Mighty Ducks, Anaheim's American Hockey League (AHL) affiliate. He recorded 28 points in his professional rookie season with Cincinnati, then took a major step the next season as he was moved to the Portland Pirates, which became the Mighty Ducks' AHL affiliate in 2005–06. He scored 39 goals and 84 points in 57 games with Portland while also making his NHL debut, appearing in 19 games with the Mighty Ducks that season. He was originally called up on November 23, 2005, being sent back and forth from the minors. During the Mighty Ducks' 2006 Stanley Cup playoff run, Penner scored 9 points in 13 games until Anaheim was eliminated by the Edmonton Oilers in the Western Conference Finals.

Penner earned a full-time roster spot with the Ducks in 2006–07 and broke out with 29 goals and 45 points playing with Ryan Getzlaf and Corey Perry on a unit dubbed the "Kid Line". Penner's goal total was the second-highest on the team, only trailing superstar Teemu Selänne. He also set the Ducks' franchise rookie record for most points (surpassed by Bobby Ryan in 2008–09). During the Ducks' 2007 Stanley Cup run, Penner scored the game-winner in Game 1 of the Western Conference Quarter-finals against the Minnesota Wild and Game 4 of the Stanley Cup Finals against the Ottawa Senators. In Game 5, Penner and the Ducks defeated the Senators 6–2 to win the 2007 Stanley Cup. Penner became the first former Maine Black Bear to win the Stanley Cup as a player.

Edmonton Oilers
After winning the Stanley Cup with the Ducks, Penner's entry-level contract expired and he became a restricted free agent in the off-season. With the Ducks dealing with salary cap issues and the signing of Todd Bertuzzi, Edmonton Oilers general manager Kevin Lowe jumped at the opportunity and signed Penner to a five-year, $21.25 million offer sheet. Lowe was criticized by the media and Ducks general manager Brian Burke. After seven days had passed, the Ducks were ultimately unwilling to match the offer and Penner became an Oiler. Penner remained the most recent player to change teams via an offer sheet for 14 years, until Montreal Canadiens accepted an offer sheet from Carolina Hurricanes for Jesperi Kotkaniemi.

In his first season with the Oilers, Penner scored a team-high 23 goals and improved to 47 points. He then began the 2008–09 season with a slow start and was publicly criticized by head coach Craig MacTavish for a lack of fitness and competitiveness after being made a healthy scratch for the second consecutive game.

Penner was confirmed to be a part of a planned summertime 2009 blockbuster trade that would see Andrew Cogliano, Ladislav Šmíd and himself dealt to the Ottawa Senators in exchange for disgruntled All-Star forward Dany Heatley. Ultimately, Heatley exercised the no-trade clause contained in his contract and the trade could not be finalized (shortly after, Heatley accepted a trade to the San Jose Sharks).

Penner got off to a strong start in 2009–10 season and was fourth in NHL scoring with 11 goals and 11 assists after 18 games played. On October 22, for the first time in his career, he scored five points (two goals and three assists), in a game against the Columbus Blue Jackets. His linemates for that game were Aleš Hemský (one goal and four assists) and Sam Gagner (one goal and two assists). At season's end, the Oilers had finished last overall in the NHL, but Penner had recorded career-highs in goals (32) and points (63).

Los Angeles Kings
On February 28, 2011, Penner was traded to the Los Angeles Kings in exchange for Colten Teubert, a first-round draft pick in 2011 (Oscar Klefbom) and a conditional third-round pick in the 2012 (Daniil Zharkov).

On January 7, 2012, Penner experienced back spasms while attempting to eat what he described as "delicious pancakes". The injury caused him to miss a game and become the subject of pancake-related jokes among fans.

On May 22, 2012, Penner scored the winning goal in overtime in Game 5 against the Phoenix Coyotes to advance the Kings to the 2012 Stanley Cup Finals. On June 11, 2012, Penner won his second Stanley Cup after the Kings defeated the New Jersey Devils 6–1 in Game 6.

Penner is the 21st NHL player to play for both sides of the "Freeway Face-Off" between the Anaheim Ducks and the Los Angeles Kings, and the only one to win the Stanley Cup with both teams.

On July 1, 2012, Penner signed a one-year, $3.25 million contract extension with Los Angeles.

Return to Anaheim
On July 16, 2013, as a free agent, Penner returned to the Anaheim Ducks after signing a one-year, $2 million contract with the team. During the 2013–14 season, he rebounded offensively with the Ducks, reuniting with former line-mates Ryan Getzlaf and Corey Perry.

Trade to Washington
On March 4, 2014, approach the NHL trade deadline date and having scored a respectable 13 goals and 32 points with Anaheim in 49 games, Penner was traded to the Washington Capitals in exchange for a fourth-round draft pick.

Career statistics

Regular season and playoffs

Awards and honors

Transactions
May 12, 2004 - Dustin Penner was signed as a free agent by the Mighty Ducks of Anaheim.
August 2, 2007 - Signed as a restricted free agent by the Edmonton Oilers to an offer sheet that was not matched by the Anaheim Ducks. The Ducks received 1st, 2nd, and 3rd round picks from the Edmonton Oilers as compensation in the 2008 NHL Entry Draft.
February 28, 2011 - Traded to Los Angeles Kings.
July 1, 2012 - Resigned with the Los Angeles Kings as an unrestricted free agent.
July 16, 2013 - Dustin Penner returned to the Anaheim Ducks as an unrestricted free agent.
March 4, 2014 - Traded to the Washington Capitals.

References

External links

1982 births
Anaheim Ducks players
Canadian ice hockey left wingers
Cincinnati Mighty Ducks players
Edmonton Oilers players
Ice hockey people from Manitoba
Living people
Maine Black Bears men's ice hockey players
Mighty Ducks of Anaheim players
Portland Pirates players
Sportspeople from Winkler, Manitoba
Stanley Cup champions
Washington Capitals players
Los Angeles Kings players
Undrafted National Hockey League players